Jorge Ríos may refer to:
 Jorge Ríos (footballer), Peruvian footballer
 Jorge Rios (sport shooter), Cuban sport shooter
 Jorge Rios (cyclist), Portuguese cyclist